Antennablennius sexfasciatus is a species of combtooth blenny which is found in the south western Indian Ocean off South Africa.

References

sexfasciatus
Fish described in 1923